Paramblesthidopsis ochreosignata is a species of beetle in the family Cerambycidae, and the only species in the genus Paramblesthidopsis. It was described by Breuning in 1981.

References

Apomecynini
Beetles described in 1981
Monotypic beetle genera